Ostriches are large flightless birds. They are the heaviest living birds, and lay the largest eggs of any living land animal. With the ability to run at 70 km/h (43.5 mph), they are the fastest birds on land. They are farmed worldwide, with significant industries in the Philippines and Namibia. Ostrich leather is a lucrative commodity, and the large feathers are used as plumes for the decoration of ceremonial headgear. Ostrich eggs have been used by humans for millennia.

Ostriches are of the genus Struthio in the order Struthioniformes, part of the infra-class Palaeognathae, a diverse group of flightless birds also known as ratites that includes the emus, rheas, and kiwis. There are two living species of ostrich: the common ostrich, native to large areas of sub-Saharan Africa, and the Somali ostrich, native to the Horn of Africa.  The common ostrich used to be native to the Arabian Peninsula, and ostriches were present across Asia as far east as Mongolia during the Late Pleistocene and possibly into the Holocene.

Taxonomic history
The genus Struthio was first described by Carl Linnaeus in 1758. The genus was used by Linnaeus and other early taxonomists to include the emu, rhea, and cassowary, until they each were placed in their own genera. The Somali ostrich (Struthio molybdophanes) has recently become recognized as a separate species by most authorities, while others are still reviewing the evidence.

Evolution
Struthionidae is a member of the Struthioniformes, a group of paleognath birds which first appeared during the Early Eocene, and includes a variety of flightless forms which were present across the Northern Hemisphere (Europe, Asia and North America) during the Eocene epoch. The closest relatives of Struthionidae within the Struthioniformes are the Ergilornithidae, known from the late Eocene to early Pliocene of Asia. It is therefore most likely that Struthionidae originated in Asia.

The earliest fossils of the genus Struthio are from the early Miocene ~21 million years ago of Namibia in Africa, so it is proposed that genus is of African origin. By the middle to late Miocene (5–13 mya) they had spread to and become widespread across Eurasia. While the relationship of the African fossil species is comparatively straightforward, many Asian species of ostrich have been described from fragmentary remains, and their interrelationships and how they relate to the African ostriches are confusing. In India, Mongolia and China, ostriches are known to have become extinct only around, or even after, the end of the last ice age; images of ostriches have been found prehistoric Chinese pottery and petroglyphs.

Distribution and habitat 
Today, ostriches are only found natively in the wild in Africa, where they occur in a range of open arid and semi-arid habitats such as savannas and the Sahel, both north and south of the equatorial forest zone. The Somali ostrich occurs in the Horn of Africa, having evolved isolated from the common ostrich by the geographic barrier of the East African Rift. In some areas, the common ostrich's Masai subspecies occurs alongside the Somali ostrich, but they are kept from interbreeding by behavioral and ecological differences. The Arabian ostriches in Asia Minor and Arabia were hunted to extinction by the middle of the 20th century, and in Israel attempts to introduce North African ostriches to fill their ecological role have failed. Escaped common ostriches in Australia have established feral populations.

Species

In 2008, S. linxiaensis was transferred to the genus Orientornis. Three additional species, S. pannonicus, S. dmanisensis, and S. transcaucasicus, were transferred to the genus Pachystruthio in 2019. Several additional fossil forms are ichnotaxa (that is, classified according to the organism's trace fossils such as footprints rather than its body) and their association with those described from distinctive bones is contentious and in need of revision pending more good material.

The species are:

Prehistoric
 †Struthio barbarus Arambourg 1979
 †Struthio brachydactylus Burchak-Abramovich 1939 (Pliocene of Ukraine)
 †Struthio chersonensis (Brandt 1873) Lambrecht 1921 (Pliocene of SE Europe to WC Asia) – oospecies
 †Struthio coppensi Mourer-Chauviré et al. 1996 (Early Miocene of Elizabethfeld, Namibia)
 †Struthio daberasensis Pickford, Senut & Dauphin 1995 (Early – Middle Pliocene of Namibia) – oospecies
 †Struthio kakesiensis Harrison & Msuya 2005 (Early Pliocene of Laetoli, Tanzania) – oospecies
 †Struthio karingarabensis Senut, Dauphin & Pickford 1998 (Late Miocene – Early Pliocene of SW and CE Africa) – oospecies(?)
 †Struthio oldawayi Lowe 1933 (Late Pleistocene of Tanzania) – probably subspecies of S. camelus
 †Struthio orlovi Kuročkin & Lungo 1970 (Late Miocene of Moldavia)
 †Struthio wimani Lowe 1931 (Early Pliocene of China and Mongolia)
Late Pleistocene  Holocene
 †Struthio anderssoni Lowe 1931, East Asian ostrich (Late Pleistocene of China to Mongolia)  
 †Struthio asiaticus Brodkorb 1863, Asian ostrich (Early Pliocene – Early Holocene of Central Asia to China? and Morocco)
 Struthio camelus, common ostrich
 Struthio camelus camelus, North African ostrich
 Struthio camelus massaicus, Masai ostrich
 Struthio camelus australis, South African ostrich
 †Struthio camelus syriacus, Arabian ostrich
 Struthio molybdophanes, Somali ostrich

Citations

General references 
 
 
 
 
 

 
Extant Miocene first appearances
Flightless birds
Miocene birds
Ratites
Taxa named by Carl Linnaeus